The Portuguese Karting Championship is a kart racing series based in Portugal. It has taken place in every year since 2007.

Champions

Junior

X30 

* represents a year in which a competition in shift karts took place

Juvenil

References

External links 
 https://www.driverdb.com/championships/karting/

Kart racing series